In the First Battle of Polotsk, which took place on 17–18 August 1812, Russian troops under the command of Peter Wittgenstein fought French and Bavarian troops led by Nicolas Oudinot near the city of Polotsk, halting Oudinot's advance toward Saint Petersburg. The First Battle of Polotsk should be distinguished from the Second Battle of Polotsk which took place during the same campaign two months later.

Prelude
After the battle of Klyastitsy and several minor losses, Oudinot's Corps retreated to Polotsk.

Battle
In the early morning of 17 August, the 1st Infantry Corps led by Wittgenstein attacked the French positions near the village of Spas, forcing the French to retreat. Oudinot transported additional units to the sector of the attack and also counterattacked in the centre. By the night both the French and the Russians managed to keep their positions. Oudinot was wounded and had to hand over the command to Gouvion Saint-Cyr.

The next morning Gouvion Saint-Cyr undertook a major offensive. He managed to mislead Wittgenstein about the area of the offensive, regroup his troops and suddenly attack the left flank and centre of the Russian positions. In the beginning the offensive was a major success, the French troops crushed the Russians and captured seven cannons.

When defeat seemed imminent, Wittgenstein organized a cavalry counterattack. It caused a scare among the French, who ceased the offensive and retreated. Wittgenstein retreated to the Drissa. Wittgenstein managed with his much smaller force effectively halted two French corps trying to advance to Saint Petersburg, which deed later gave him the Russian general-in-chief post.

Casualties
French-Bavarian losses numbered 6,000 killed, wounded. The Russians lost 5,500. Bavarian general officer losses were heavy. General of Infantry Bernhard Erasmus von Deroy was mortally wounded and General-Major Siebein was killed. General-Majors Vincenti and Raglovitch were both wounded. Among the French, both Oudinot and General of Brigade François Valentin were wounded. Russian Generals Berg, Hamen, and Kazatchkowski suffered wounds.

Aftermath
For the next two months both the French and the Russians did not attempt to upset the balance of powers.

See also
List of battles of the French invasion of Russia

Notes

References

See also
 Second Battle of Polotsk

External links
 

Battles of the French invasion of Russia
Battles of the Napoleonic Wars
Battles inscribed on the Arc de Triomphe
Battles involving France
Battles involving Russia
Conflicts in 1812
August 1812 events
1812 in the Russian Empire
1812 in Belarus
Polotsk
Military history of Belarus